John Dean (born 1938) was U.S. White House Counsel to President Nixon.

John Dean may also refer to:
 John Dean (convict), youngest person executed in the history of England
 John Dean (Pennsylvania Supreme Court justice) (1835–1905), Pennsylvania Supreme Court justice from 1892 to 1905
 John Dean (tenor) (1897–1990), English singer and actor
 John Dean (cyclist) (born 1947), New Zealand Olympic cyclist
 John Dean (footballer) (born 1956), Australian rules footballer
 John Gunther Dean (born 1926), U.S. diplomat
 John M. Dean (1852–1909), Texas state senator from El Paso County, 1892–1896, see Texas Senate, District 25
 John M. Dean (1859–1920), Texas state representative from Van Zandt County, 1899–1903
 John F. Dean (born 1946), U.S. Tax Court judge
 Jono Dean (born 1984), Australian cricketer
 Johnno Dean, character in long running UK drama series Hollyoaks
 John Dean, sole British survivor of the sinking of the Sussex East Indiaman, at Bassas da India in 1738
 John S. Dean, author of Murder Most Foul (1947) in his capacity of chair of the Pedestrians Association (UK).
 John Dean (Massachusetts politician), representative to the Great and General Court
 Sean O'Mahony (journalist) (1932–2020), British music writer and magazine editor, who wrote under the name Johnny Dean
 Johnny Dean  (born 1971), British musician
 John Wooster Dean (1874–1950), American actor better known as Jack Dean

See also
John Deane (disambiguation)
Jonathan Dean House, historic house in Massachusetts
John Dean Provincial Park, Canada